Jo-Wilfried Tsonga was the defending champion, but he resigned from the participation in this tournament due to tiredness caused by his performance at the 2010 Australian Open (he reached the semifinals, where he lost to Roger Federer).

Feliciano López won in the final 7–5, 6–1 against Stéphane Robert. It was López's second title of his career, and first since 2004.

Seeds

Draw

Finals

Top half

Bottom half

Qualifying
All seeded players received a bye into the second round, and all players playing in the fourth qualifier received a bye into the second round.

Seeds

Qualifiers

Draw

First qualifier

Second qualifier

Third qualifier

Fourth qualifier

External links
 Main Draw
 Qualifying Draw

2010 SA Tennis Open
SA Tennis Open - Singles
2010 in South African tennis